is the 34th single by Japanese idol group Berryz Kobo,  released in Japan on February 19, 2014.

The physical CD single debuted at 4th place in the Japanese Oricon weekly singles chart.

Charts

References

External links 
 Profile of the CD single  on the official website of Hello! Project

2014 singles
Japanese-language songs
Berryz Kobo songs
Songs written by Tsunku
Song recordings produced by Tsunku
2014 songs
Piccolo Town singles
Electronic dance music songs
Japanese synth-pop songs
Songs with feminist themes